Dedu may refer to:

Dedu County, former name of Wudalianchi City
Deda mac Sin, also called Dedu, prehistoric king of Érainn